In computer software, Grok is a library to encode and decode images in the JPEG 2000 format. It fully implements Part 1 of the ISO/IEC 15444-1 technical standard. It is designed for stability, high performance, and low memory usage. Grok is free and open-source software released under the GNU Affero General Public License (AGPL) version 3.

Features

 High performance - grk_decompress is currently over 1/2 the speed of Kakadu, one of the leading commercial JPEG 2000 libraries
 Fast sub-tile decode
 Supports decoding to stdout for png, jpeg, bmp, pnm, and raw output formats
 Supports TLM code stream marker for fast single-tile and sub-tile decoding of large tiled images
 Supports PLT code stream marker for fast sub-tile decoding of large single-tile images
 Full support for ICC profiles and other meta-data such as XML, IPTC and XMP
 Supports new Part 15 of the standard, aka High Throughput JPEG 2000, which promises up to a 10x speed up over the original Part 1 of the JPEG 2000 standard

Integration
Grok has been integrated into a number of other open source projects, including:

 Cantaloupe image server
 IIPSrv image server
 Horos medical image viewer

References

Further reading 
 "JPEG2000 Image Compression Fundamentals, Standards and Practice", by David S. Taubman, Michael W. Marcellin.

External links
 
 User guide

See also 
 OpenJPEG
 Kakadu

JPEG
C++ libraries
Graphics libraries